The 2019 Pan American Fencing Championships were held in Toronto, Canada from 27 June to July 2, 2019. The competition was held at the Delta Hotel Toronto Airport and Conference Centre.

Medal summary

Men's events

Women's events

Medal table

References

Pan American Fencing Championships
Pan American Fencing Championships
International fencing competitions hosted by Canada
Pan American Fencing Championships
Fencing in Canada
Pan American Fencing Championships
Pan American Fencing Championships
International sports competitions in Toronto